The Lėvuo is a river in Northern Lithuania, a right tributary of the river Mūša. Lėvuo is 148 kilometres long. In 1931 Sanžilė channel, connecting Lėvuo and Nevėžis rivers was built. Biggest tributary rivers of Lėvuo are Mituva, Svalia, Kupa and Viešinta.

References

Rivers of Lithuania